Kazimír is a village and municipality in the Trebišov District in the Košice Region of eastern Slovakia.

Genealogical resources

The records for genealogical research are available at the state archive "Statny Archiv in Kosice, Slovakia"

 Roman Catholic church records (births/marriages/deaths): 1774-1900 (parish A)
 Greek Catholic church records (births/marriages/deaths): 1826-1933 (parish B)
 Lutheran church records (births/marriages/deaths): 1827-1893 (parish B)
 Reformated church records (births/marriages/deaths): 1800-1893 (parish B)

See also
 List of municipalities and towns in Slovakia

External links
Surnames of living people in Kazimir

Villages and municipalities in Trebišov District